National Geographic is a subscription television network, launched in Greece in 2001 by the Fox Networks Group. The channel features documentaries with factual content involving nature, science, culture, and history. Shows can be watched in English with Greek subtitles.

For the first 12 years, the channel was available only to the subscribers of Nova satellite bouquet. During the 2000s, foreign versions used to be available (Dutch & Romanian), but as from September 2011, the channel has been fully relaunched in Greek.

Programmes on National Geographic
Banged Up Abroad
Big, Bigger, Biggest
Bite Me
Britain's Greatest Machines
Dog Whisperer with Cesar Millan
Great Migrations
Hooked
Hunter Hunted
Is It Real?
Lockdown
Mad Labs
Megacities in Judge Dredd
Megafactories
Megastructures
Monkey Thieves
Mysteries of the Bible
Mysteries of the Deep
Mystery Files
Naked Science
Shark Men
Stonehenge Decoded
Storm Stories
Strange Days on Planet Earth
Taboo
The Dark Side of Hippos
The Living Edens
Thrill Zone
Thunder Beasts
Totally Wild
Wild Russia
World of Wildlife

Programmes on Nat Geo Wild

Other National Geographic channels in Greece

National Geographic Music
National Geographic Music was a subscription television network which broadcast documentaries concerning 'the meeting between music and culture' around the world. It was available in Greece only in Cosmote TV and in OnTV. It stopped broadcasting in 2011 around the world, including Greece.

Nat Geo Wild
National Geographic Wild is a subscription television network which broadcasts documentaries about natural wildlife and wildlife history, with a focus on natures most fierce predators. It is available in Cosmote TV, Vodafone TV and in Nova Greece and in Cyprus it is available on Nova Cyprus, Cablenet and on CytaVision.

National Geographic HD
National Geographic HD (NGC HD) in Greece is a 720p high definition simulcast of the National Geographic in Greece. It launched on 22 December 2010. It is available in Cosmote TV, Vodafone TV and in Nova Greece and in Cyprus it is available on Nova Cyprus, Cablenet and on CytaVision.

Nat Geo Wild HD
Nat Geo Wild HD in Greece is a 720p high definition simulcast of the Nat Geo Wild in Greece. It launched on 17 March 2011 and is available in Cosmote TV, Vodafone TV and in Nova Greece and in Cyprus it is available on Nova Cyprus, Cablenet and on CytaVision.

See also
FX Greece
Fox Life Greece

External links
National Geographic Greece official site

Television channels in Greece
Television channels and stations established in 2001